Rappie pie is a traditional Acadian dish from southwest Nova Scotia, New-Brunswick and areas of Prince Edward Island. It is sometimes referred to as rapure pie or râpure. Its name is derived from the French patates râpées meaning 'grated potatoes'. It is a casserole-like dish formed by grating potatoes, then squeezing them through cheesecloth to remove some of the water from the potato solids. The removed liquid is replaced by adding hot broth made from chicken, pork or seafood along with meat and onions, and layering additional grated potatoes over the top.
Common meat fillings include beef, chicken, or bar clams.

History
It is thought that rappie pie has its origins in the Acadian Expulsion, among Acadians who lived out their exile in Massachusetts. This opportunity to meet and interact with other immigrant groups would naturally encourage a sharing of cultural recipes. It may have been German or Swiss immigrants who taught the Acadians their technique for using grated potatoes in their recipes, but whoever it was, this proved to be an important tip for those that returned to Nova Scotia when the expulsion was lifted. When they returned, they found that their fertile land had been given to New Englanders lured north by the promise of farmland. The harsh, rocky land that remained was excellent for growing potatoes, if little else, so the Acadians used them to fill out dishes made with what game was available.

See also
 Gratin, the French cuisine cooking technique
 Rösti, the national Swiss dish of shredded potatoes
 Hotdish, the Northern Midwestern American casserole
 List of casserole dishes

References

Cuisine of Atlantic Canada
Potato dishes
Casserole dishes
Canadian cuisine
Acadian cuisine